Kylesa is an American heavy metal band that was formed in Savannah, Georgia. Their music incorporates experimentalism with heavy riffs, drop-tuned guitars and elements of psychedelic rock. The group was established in 2001 by the former members of Damad, with the addition of guitar player Laura Pleasants who is from North Carolina. The band has since undergone line up changes; the remaining original members are Phillip Cope and Laura Pleasants. In 2006, the band added two drummers (Carl McGinley of Unpersons, from Savannah, and Jeff Porter). Eric Hernandez (of Capsule, from Miami) joined in 2008 to replace Porter. The dual drum tracks are often panned strongly to the right and left.

In April 2016, the band announced in a Facebook post that they would be going on an indefinite hiatus.

History
Kylesa is a metal group that borrows elements of hardcore punk, psychedelic rock, stoner rock, sludge metal, and speed metal. They have two singers, Phillip and Laura. Kylesa formed in Savannah in 2001, taking their name from "kilesa mara", a Buddhist term denoting delusory mental states.

Guitarist and singer Phillip Cope, bassist Brian Duke and drummer Christian Depken were former members of the Savannah sludge metal act Damad, which had released two albums in the '90s.
Philip Cope has been described as the Savannah "metal scene's godfather". He began playing in hardcore punk groups in the late 1980s, and in 1992 booked groups such as Buzzoven and Neurosis at a local all-ages club. From 1993 to 2001, Cope played in the group Damad. Pat Mathis of the Passive Fist label said that Damad "established a sound that's stuck-- that whole heavy, doomy Southern kind of metal. When you've got these old punk guys who listen to the Allman Brothers and start a metal band, that's kind of what you get." Damad changed their name to Kylesa in 2001 with the addition of Laura Pleasants, a native of North Carolina who attended the Savannah College of Art and Design.

After recording the majority of their first record (self-titled on Prank) in May 2001, Kylesa played their first show with Mastodon and Cream Abdul Babar in Savannah, Georgia on June 2, 2001. On June 6, 2001, Brian Duke died from an epileptic seizure during the course of the night. The band decided to finish the recording in Brian's honor, wrote and recorded two more songs (where local bass player and friend Michael Redmond stepped in and played bass). The self-titled record was released about one year later on Prank Records when artwork by Pushead was completed. Prior to the full LP, a single limited 7-inch was released on Prank also with Pushead artwork.  The Pushead-designed Band Logo from these releases has been used on all the band's merchandise and releases ever since.

Replacing Duke with bassist and singer Corey Barhorst, the band wrote and recorded a split 7-inch with Memento Mori, on Hyperrealist, and a split full length with Cream Abdul Babar from Florida, on At a Loss Recordings. These records came out immediately following the release on Prank, although they were recorded much later, The long wait for artwork by Pushead delaying the release of the self-titled LP. More singles and a placeholder EP, 2004's No Ending 110 Degree Heat Index followed right before Depken left the group.

Kylesa signed with the independent metal label Prosthetic Records and released their second proper album, To Walk a Middle Course, in 2005 with drummer Brandon Baltzley.

Following the release of that album, Baltzley left the group, replaced by a pair of drummers, Jeff Porter and Carl McGinley. Kylesa's third album, Time Will Fuse Its Worth, was released on Halloween 2006. Eric Hernandez replaced Porter and appears on Static Tensions, released in 2009. Two songs on this album were inspired by the shooting of Jason Statts, a Savannah musician. They toured with Mastodon after the release of this album, whose guitarist, Bill Kelliher, said that 

Journalist David Peisner of Spin described them as "dark psych-metal titans", practicing an "aggressive [sound], but with a hazy, stoner vibe that suggests a strange amalgamation of Black Sabbath, Black Flag, and early Pink Floyd." As of 2010, they have sold 75,000 albums. In 2010 they signed to the Season of Mist records label to release the album Spiral Shadow on October 26 that year. A rarities compilation album titled From the Vaults, Vol. 1 was released later that year.

Their sixth album, Ultraviolet, was released through Season of Mist in May 2013. The record is said to be darker lyrically and sonically than previous works, containing more vocals from singer/guitarist Laura Pleasants. The band embarked on a full North America headlining tour to promote the release with direct support from Blood Ceremony, White Hills and Lazer Wulf. In October 2015, the group released their seventh album Exhausting Fire through Season of Mist.

Band members
Core members / current
Phillip Cope – vocals, guitars, samples (2001–present)
Laura Pleasants – vocals, guitars (2001–present)
Carl McGinley – drums, percussion, keys / samples (2006–present)

Former / live
Brian Duke – bass, vocals (2001; died 2001)
Corey Barhorst – bass, vocals (2001–2007, 2008–2011)
Javier Villegas – bass (2008–2008)
Chase Rudeseal – bass (2012–2015)
Christian Depken – drums, percussion (2001–2004)
Brandon Baltzley – drums, percussion (2004–2005)
Jason Cadwell – drums, percussion (2005)
Edley O'Dowd – drums, percussion (2014)
Marshall Kirkpatrick – drums, percussion (2009)
Jeff Porter – drums, percussion (2006–2007)
Tyler Newberry – drums, percussion (2007, 2010–2013)
Eric Hernandez –drums, percussion (2008–2009, Bass 2012)
Session
Michael Redmond – bass (on Kylesa)
Bobby Scandiffio – guitar and crickets (on Time Will Fuse Its Worth)
Jay Matheson – bass (on "Exhausting Fire")

 Timeline

Discography

Studio albums
Kylesa (2002)
To Walk a Middle Course (2005)
Time Will Fuse Its Worth (2006)
Static Tensions (2009)
Spiral Shadow (2010)
Ultraviolet (2013)
Exhausting Fire (2015)

EPs
Point of Stillness 7-inch (2002)
No Ending / 110° Heat Index (2004)
Delusion on Fire (2003)
Bacteria Sour double 7-inch (2004)
Unknown Awareness (2009)
Violitionist Sessions (2013)
Live at Maida Vale Studios (2017)

Split releases
Split with Memento Mori (2002)
Split with Cream Abdul Babar (2003)
Split with Victims (2009)

Music videos
 "A 100º Heat Index" (2004)
 "Where the Horizon Unfolds" (2006)
 "Hollow Severer" (2007)
 "Tired Climb" (2010)
 "Unspoken" (2013)
 "Low Tide" (2013)
 "Lost and Confused" (2015)

Other appearances
For the Sick - Eyehategod tribute album (2007)
Like Black Holes in the Sky - Syd Barrett tribute album (2008)
Metal Swim - Adult Swim compilation album (2010)
From the Vaults, Vol. 1 - Season Of Mist compilation album (2012)
"Come as You Are" (originally by Nirvana; tribute album Whatever Nevermind) (2015, Robotic Empire)

References

Bibliography

External links
 
 Kylesa at Loudside.com
 Article about Kylesa in Stomp and Stammer

American sludge metal musical groups
Heavy metal musical groups from Georgia (U.S. state)
Musical groups established in 2001
American avant-garde metal musical groups
Musical quintets
American stoner rock musical groups
Season of Mist artists
Musical groups from Savannah, Georgia